I Am the River, the River Is Me is the fifth studio album by Australian musician Jen Cloher. The album was recorded between New Zealand and Melbourne, Australia and is Cloher's first to feature songs sung in both English and te reo Māori. 

I Am the River, the River Is Me was announced in November 2022 and released on 3 March 2023 via Milk! Records. The album will be supported by an Australian tour, commencing in Perth on 6 May 2023 before heading to Europe in June 2023 and concluding in New Zealand in July 2023.

Reception

Giselle Au-Nhien Nguyen of Sydney Morning Herald said "Sonically, the record leans into a folksy palette that brings to mind Cloher's earlier work" saying, I Am the River, the River Is Me reads like a love letter to many things: heritage, queerness, oneself. Cloher is one of Australia's finest songwriters, one who takes time between releases and produces music that is in equal parts contemplative and joyful. This is a special record that pays tribute to the past and the future, blending the personal and the political and showing that everything is interconnected".

Deb Pelser of Back Seat Mafia said "This album is all encompassing – it spans the personal, the exploration of their Māori heritage and is also a commentary on our recent political situation, all delivered in a collection of astute songs that are superbly produced and lushly orchestrated." Pelser added "Despite the undeniable tension that must have pervaded the genesis of these songs, Cloher's confident delivery, backed by some fine musicians, results in an album that is upbeat, hopeful and simply beautiful. Whilst it documents Cloher's personal quest it has universal themes that will resonate widely".

Bryget Chrisfield of Beat Magazine said "Many of I Am the River, the River Is Me's songs flow with a sense of curious self-discovery, while others challenge: like initiating difficult convos and welcoming discomfort as an opportunity for personal growth."

Track listing

Charts

Release history

References

2023 albums
Albums by Australian artists